Blood Meridian is the fifth studio album by Numb, released on September 30, 1997 by Metropolis Records. When asked about the album, composer Don Gordon said "his album was an experiment for us, in that we wrote it very quickly. We had another album that was finished that was getting entangled in all sorts of legal issues, so we decided to sit down and write "Blood Meridian" very quickly so we could meet our release schedule."

Reception

AllMusic called Blood Meridian a "relentless album" that "does not stagnate" and further said its "impossible for passive listening, a testament to its intensity." Vicki Aubin of CMJ praised the band for maintaining "a firm solid palette of darkness and aggression" Lollipop Magazine credited the band for standing out from then current competition and praised their use of symphonic elements. A critic at Sonic Boom praised the music's grinding and pulsing rhythms, saying "it seems that Don has decided to meld together all of his old trademark musical structures with noise and techno and infuse into a new caustic Electro hybrid that abuses your ears while it drives your body to flail to the percussion."

Track listing

Personnel
Adapted from the Blood Meridian liner notes.

Numb
 David Collings – lead vocals, instruments, production, engineering, mixing
 Don Gordon – instruments, production, engineering, mixing

Production and design
 MMM Graphics – design
 Tim Oberthier – engineering
 Dee Partdrige – photography
 Craig Waddell – mastering

Release history

References

External links 
 Blood Meridian at Bandcamp
 

1997 albums
Numb (band) albums
Metropolis Records albums
Zoth Ommog albums